Frank McDonald (born 1950) is an author, journalist, environmentalist and former environment editor of The Irish Times.

Career
McDonald began his journalism career as a freelance New York Correspondent for the Irish Press newspaper from 1972 to 1973, sub-editor with the Irish Press from 1973 to 1977 and reporter from 1977 to 1978. He joined the Irish Times in 1979, becoming Environment Correspondent in 1986, a post which he held until he was appointed Environment Editor in 2000. Throughout his career, his writing has focused on planning and development in Dublin, from the demolition of parts of Georgian Dublin to the effect of Airbnb. He was a founding member of the Academy of Urbanism of Great Britain and Ireland. McDonald retired from the Irish Times in 2015.

Awards
Outstanding Work in Irish Journalism, 1979
Lord Mayor's Millennium Medal, 1988
Chartered Institute of Transport Journalist of the Year, 1998
ESB National Media Award for Campaigning Journalism, 1999
ESB National Media Award for Features (Print), 2003
Lord Mayor's Award, 2003
Honorary D.Phil.,  Dublin Institute of Technology, 2006
Press Fellow, Wolfson College, Cambridge, Lent Term, 2008
Honorary member, Royal Institute of the Architects of Ireland, 2010
Honorary fellow, Royal Institute of British Architects, 2011
Honorary Fellow, Royal College of Surgeons Ireland, 2019

Bibliography
The Destruction of Dublin, Gill and Macmillan, 1985
Saving the City, Tomar, 1989
Ireland's Earthen Houses (jointly with Peigin Doyle), A&A Farmar, 1997
The Ecological Footprint of Cities (editor), International Institute for the Urban Environment, 1998
The Daily Globe: Environmental change, the public and the media (contributor), Earthscan, 2000
The Construction of Dublin, Gandon Editions, 2000
Chaos at the Crossroads (jointly with James Nix), Gandon Books, 2005

Truly Frank (2018)

Personal life 
He was born in Dublin in 1950, growing up in Cabra. He was educated at Kelly's Private School Cabra Road, St. Vincent's C.B.S. Glasnevin and University College Dublin, graduating with a BA (History and Politics) in 1971. During his time in UCD, he was editor of the Observer from 1970 to 1972, deputy president of Students' Representative Council from 1970 to 1971.

He has lived in the Temple Bar area of Dublin since 1995. He married his long-term partner, Eamon Slater, in 2016.

In 2010, he admitted to hitting a female manager in the River House Hotel in Eustace Street, after becoming frustrated with the high level of noise coming from the hotel's Mezz bar and nightclub. In a subsequent licensing case, the Dublin Circuit Court heard that complaints about the premises dated back over 15 years and the judge said they were "well-grounded", but the licence was ultimately renewed.

References

1950 births
Living people
The Irish Times people
Irish writers
Irish architectural historians